Novoqolovka is a former village in the municipality of Uzuntəpə in the Jalilabad Rayon of Azerbaijan.

References

Populated places in Jalilabad District (Azerbaijan)